Louis Pierre Goullaud (23 November 1840 – 7 December 1919) published and sold music in Boston, Massachusetts, in the 19th century. In the 1860s he worked for "Koppitz, Pruefer & Co." With Asa Warren White (1826–1894) and his son, Edward Warren White (1849–1896) – as the firm "White & Goullaud" – he sold musical instruments and published sheet music (c. 1869 – 1875). Under his own imprint he issued sheet music and Goullaud's Monthly Journal of Music. He retired c. 1886, and died in Braintree on December 7, 1919.

Published by Goullaud
 Little Rosewood Casket. 1870
 The Dundreary Polka. Composed and inscribed to Mr. Sothern by Thomas Baker. 1872
 Inman Line March. Composed by A.E. Warren. Respectfully Inscribed to William Inman Esq. 1872
 The Little Frauds, Harrigan & Hart's Songs & Sketches. 1872
 Thematic Catalogue of Popular Songs. 1872
 Gentle Spring Waltz dedicated to Fanny Davenport. 1873
 Lotta's Favorite Nocturne for piano by J. W. Turner. 1873
 Johnny You're In Luck, Sung With Unbounded Success By "Bryants Minstrels." 1874
 The Shaughraun Waltz by Thomas Baker. 1875
 Fifth Avenue George, a Popular Song. Sung with unbounded applause by Tony Pastor. Written & Composed by J. P. Skelly. 1876
 George H. Coes's Album of Music. 1876
 Evangeline, Opera Bouffe. List of Original Music. Libretto by J. Cheever Goodwin. Music by Edward E. Rice. 1877
 Songs of the Rice Surprise Party. 1880

Images

References

External links

 WorldCat. Goullaud, Louis P.
 http://hdl.loc.gov/loc.music/sm1877.03294 
 http://imslp.org/wiki/Grande_polonaise_brillante,_Op.26_(Pratt,_Silas_Gamaliel)
 http://imslp.org/wiki/Evening_Service_in_E-flat_major_(Gerrish,_William_H.)
 http://www.wsulibs.wsu.edu/holland/masc/finders/cage430/page1.htm

1839 births
1919 deaths
Businesspeople from Boston
19th century in Boston
American music publishers (people)
19th-century American businesspeople